The 1984 Missouri Valley Conference men's basketball tournament was played after the conclusion of the 1983–1984 regular season. The quarterfinal and semifinal rounds were played on campus sites with the final contested at the Tulsa Convention Center in Tulsa, Oklahoma.

Bracket

Note: * indicates host institution

References

1983–84 Missouri Valley Conference men's basketball season
Missouri Valley Conference men's basketball tournament
Missouri Valley Conference men's basketball tournament